Bayard Rustin (March 17, 1912 – August 24, 1987) was an African American leader in social movements for civil rights, socialism, nonviolence, and gay rights.

Rustin worked with A. Philip Randolph on the March on Washington Movement, in 1941, to press for an end to racial discrimination in employment. Rustin later organized Freedom Rides, and helped to organize the Southern Christian Leadership Conference to strengthen Martin Luther King Jr.'s leadership and teaching King about nonviolence; he later served as an organizer for the March on Washington for Jobs and Freedom. Rustin worked alongside Ella Baker, a co-director of the Crusade for Citizenship, in 1954; and before the Montgomery bus boycott, he helped organize a group, called "In Friendship", amongst Baker, Stanley Levison of the American Jewish Congress, and some other labor leaders. "In Friendship" provided material and legal assistance to those being evicted from their tenant farms and households in Clarendon County, Yazoo, and other places. Rustin became the head of the AFL–CIO's A. Philip Randolph Institute, which promoted the integration of formerly all-white unions and promoted the unionization of African Americans. During the 1970s and 1980s, Rustin served on many humanitarian missions, such as aiding refugees from Vietnam and Cambodia. At the time of his death in 1987, he was on a humanitarian mission in Haiti.

Rustin was a gay man and, due to criticism over his sexuality, he usually acted as an influential adviser behind the scenes to civil-rights leaders. In the 1980s, he became a public advocate on behalf of gay causes, speaking at events as an activist and supporter of human rights.

Later in life, while still devoted to securing workers' rights, Rustin joined other union leaders in aligning with ideological neoconservatism, and (after his death) President Ronald Reagan praised him. On November 20, 2013, President Barack Obama posthumously awarded Rustin the Presidential Medal of Freedom.

Early life and education
Rustin was born in 1912 in West Chester, Pennsylvania, to Florence Rustin and Archie Hopkins, but raised by his maternal grandparents, Julia (Davis) and Janifer Rustin, as the ninth of their twelve children; growing up he believed his biological mother was his older sister. His grandparents were relatively wealthy local caterers who raised Rustin in a large house. Julia Rustin was a Quaker, although she attended her husband's African Methodist Episcopal Church. She was also a member of the National Association for the Advancement of Colored People (NAACP). NAACP leaders such as W.E.B. Du Bois and James Weldon Johnson were frequent guests in the Rustin home. With these influences in his early life, in his youth Rustin campaigned against racially discriminatory Jim Crow laws.

One of the first documented realizations Rustin had of his sexuality was when he mentioned to his grandmother that he preferred to spend time with males rather than females. She responded, "I suppose that's what you need to do".

In 1932, Rustin entered Wilberforce College, a historically black college in Ohio operated by the AME Church. Rustin was active in a number of campus organizations, including the Omega Psi Phi fraternity. He was expelled from Wilberforce in 1936 after organizing a strike, and later attended Cheyney State Teachers College (now Cheyney University of Pennsylvania). Cheyney honored Rustin with a posthumous "Doctor of Humane Letters" degree at its 2013 commencement.

After completing an activist training program conducted by the American Friends Service Committee (AFSC), Rustin moved to Harlem in 1937 and began studying at City College of New York. There he became involved in efforts to defend and free the Scottsboro Boys, nine young black men in Alabama who were accused of raping two white women. He joined the Young Communist League for a small period of time in 1936, before becoming disillusioned with the party. Soon after arriving in New York City, he became a member of Fifteenth Street Meeting of the Religious Society of Friends (Quakers).

Rustin was an accomplished tenor vocalist, an asset that earned him admission to both Wilberforce University and Cheyney State Teachers College with music scholarships. In 1939, he was in the chorus of the short-lived Broadway musical John Henry that starred Paul Robeson. Blues singer Josh White was also a cast member and later invited Rustin to join his gospel and vocal harmony group Josh White and the Carolinians, with whom he made several recordings. With this opportunity, Rustin became a regular performer at the Café Society nightclub in Greenwich Village, widening his social and intellectual contacts. A few albums on Fellowship Records featuring his singing, such as Bayard Rustin Sings a Program of Spirituals, were produced from the 1950s through the 1970s.

Evolving affiliations
At the direction of the Soviet Union, the Communist Party USA (CPUSA) and its members were active in supporting civil rights for African Americans. The CPUSA, at the time following Stalin's "theory of nationalism", favored the creation of a separate nation for African Americans to be located in the American Southeast where the greatest proportion of the black population was concentrated. In 1941, after Germany invaded the Soviet Union, Communist International ordered the CPUSA to abandon civil rights work and focus on supporting U.S. entry into World War II.

Disillusioned, Rustin began working with members of the Socialist Party of Norman Thomas, particularly A. Philip Randolph, the head of the Brotherhood of Sleeping Car Porters. Another socialist mentor was the pacifist A. J. Muste, leader of the Fellowship of Reconciliation (FOR). FOR hired Rustin as a race relations secretary in the late summer of 1941.

The three of them proposed a march on Washington, D.C., in 1941 to protest racial segregation in the armed forces and widespread discrimination in employment. Meeting with President Roosevelt in the Oval Office, Randolph respectfully and politely, but firmly told President Roosevelt that African Americans would march in the capital unless desegregation occurred. To prove their good faith, the organizers canceled the planned march after Roosevelt issued Executive Order 8802 (the Fair Employment Act), which banned discrimination in defense industries and federal agencies. The leader of the organizers, Randolph, canceled the march against Rustin's advisement. The armed forces, in which Black troops typically had white commanding officers, were not desegregated until 1948, under an Executive Order issued by President Harry S. Truman, although the various branches took years to abide by the order, with the U.S. Marines Corps in 1960 being the last to desegregate.

Randolph felt that FOR had succeeded in their goal and wanted to dissolve the committee. Again, Rustin disagreed with him and voiced his differing opinion in a national press conference, which he later said he regretted.

Rustin traveled to California to help protect the property of the more than 120,000 Japanese-Americans (most of whom were U.S.-born citizens) who had been imprisoned in internment camps. In the 6-3 Korematsu Decision, the Supreme Court upheld the forcible internment. Impressed with Rustin's organizational skills, A.J. Muste appointed him as FOR's secretary for student and general affairs.

Rustin was also a pioneer in the movement to desegregate interstate bus travel. In 1942, he boarded a bus in Louisville, bound for Nashville, and sat in the second row. A number of drivers asked him to move to the back, according to Southern practice of Jim Crow, but Rustin refused. The bus was stopped by police 13 miles north of Nashville and Rustin was arrested. He was beaten and taken to a police station but was released uncharged.

He spoke about his decision to be arrested, and how that moment also clarified his witness as a gay person, in an interview with the Washington Blade:

In 1942, Rustin assisted two other FOR staffers, George Houser and James Farmer, and activist Bernice Fisher as they formed the Congress of Racial Equality (CORE). Rustin was not a direct founder, but was later described as "an uncle of CORE". CORE had been conceived as a pacifist organization based on the writings of Mohandas Gandhi, who used non-violent resistance against British rule in India. CORE was also influenced by his protégé Krishnalal Shridharani's book War without Violence.

As declared conscientious objectors who refused induction into the military, Rustin, Houser, and other members of FOR and CORE were convicted of violating the Selective Service Act. From 1944 to 1946, Rustin was imprisoned in Ashland Federal Prison in Kentucky, and later the Lewisburg Federal Penitentiary, in Pennsylvania. At both, he organized protests against racially segregated housing and dining facilities. During his incarceration, he also organized FOR's Free India Committee. After his release from prison, he was frequently arrested for protesting against British colonial rule, in both India and Africa.

Just before a trip to Africa while college secretary of the FOR, Rustin recorded a 10-inch LP for the Fellowship Records label. He sang spirituals and Elizabethan songs, accompanied on the harpsichord by Margaret Davison.

Influence on the Civil Rights Movement

Rustin and Houser organized the Journey of Reconciliation in 1947. This was the first of the Freedom Rides to test the 1946 ruling of the Supreme Court of the United States in Morgan v. Commonwealth of Virginia that banned racial discrimination in interstate travel as unconstitutional. Rustin and CORE executive secretary George Houser recruited a team of fourteen men, divided equally by race, to ride in pairs through Virginia, North Carolina, Tennessee, and Kentucky. The NAACP opposed CORE's Gandhian tactics as too meek. Participants in the Journey of Reconciliation were arrested several times. Arrested with Igal Roodenko and Joe Felmet, Rustin served twenty-two days on a chain gang in North Carolina for violating state Jim Crow laws regarding segregated seating on public transportation.  On June 17, 2022, Chapel Hill Superior Court Judge Allen Baddour, with full consent of the state, dismissed the 1947 North Carolina charges against the four Freedom Riders, with members of the exonerees' families in attendance.

In 1948, Rustin traveled to India to learn techniques of nonviolent civil resistance directly from the leaders of the Gandhian movement. The conference had been organized before Gandhi's assassination earlier that year. Between 1947 and 1952, Rustin also met with leaders of independence movements in Ghana and Nigeria. In 1951, he formed the committee to Support South African Resistance, which later became the American Committee on Africa.

Rustin was arrested in Pasadena, California, in January 1953 for sexual activity with two men in their 20s, in a parked car. Originally charged with vagrancy and lewd conduct, he pleaded guilty to a single, lesser charge of "sex perversion" (as sodomy was officially referred to in California then, even if consensual) and served 60 days in jail. (In 2020 California governor Gavin Newsom granted Rustin a posthumous pardon for this conviction.) The Pasadena arrest was the first time that Rustin's homosexuality had come to public attention.  He had been and remained candid in private about his sexuality, although homosexual activity was still criminalized throughout the United States. Rustin resigned from the Fellowship of Reconciliation (FOR) because of his convictions. They also greatly affected Rustin's relationship with A. J. Muste, the director of the FOR. Muste had already tried to change Rustin's sexuality earlier in their relationship with no success. Later in Rustin's life, they continued their relationship with more tension than they had previously. Rustin became the executive secretary of the War Resisters League. Later, in Montana, an American Legion chapter made his conviction in Pasadena public to try to cancel his lectures in the state.

Rustin served as an unidentified member of the American Friends Service Committee's task force to write "Speak Truth to Power: A Quaker Search for an Alternative to Violence", published in 1955. This was one of the most influential and widely commented upon pacifist essays in the United States. Rustin had wanted to keep his participation quiet, as he believed that his known sexual orientation would be used by critics as an excuse to compromise the 71-page pamphlet when it was published. It analyzed the Cold War and the American response to it, and recommended non-violent solutions.

Rustin took leave from the War Resisters League in 1956 to advise minister Martin Luther King Jr. of the Baptist Church on Gandhian tactics. King was organizing the public transportation boycott in Montgomery, Alabama, which became known as the Montgomery bus boycott. According to Rustin, "I think it's fair to say that Dr. King's view of non-violent tactics was almost non-existent when the boycott began. In other words, Dr. King was permitting himself and his children and his home to be protected by guns." Rustin convinced King to abandon the armed protection, including a personal handgun. In a 1964 interview with Robert Penn Warren for the book Who Speaks for the Negro?, Rustin also reflected that his integrative ideology began to differ from King's. He believed a social movement "has to be based on the collective needs of people at this time, regardless of color, creed, race."

The following year, Rustin and King began organizing the Southern Christian Leadership Conference (SCLC). Many African American leaders were concerned that Rustin's sexual orientation and past Communist membership would undermine support for the civil rights movement. After the organization of the SCLC, Rustin and King planned a civil rights march adjacent to the 1960 Democratic National Convention in Los Angeles. This did not sit well with U.S. Representative Adam Clayton Powell Jr. Powell threatened to leak to the press rumors of a fake affair between Rustin and King. King, acting in his interests, canceled the march, and Rustin left his position in the SCLC. King received criticism for this action from Harper's magazine, which wrote about him, "Lost much moral credit ... in the eyes of the young". Although Rustin was open about his sexual orientation and his convictions were a matter of public record, the events had not been discussed widely beyond the civil rights leadership. Rustin did not let this setback change his direction in the movement.

March on Washington

Despite shunning from some civil rights leaders,

A few weeks before the March on Washington for Jobs and Freedom in August 1963, South Carolina Senator Strom Thurmond railed against Rustin as a "Communist, draft-dodger, and homosexual", and had his entire Pasadena arrest file entered in the record. Thurmond also produced a Federal Bureau of Investigation photograph of Rustin talking to King while King was bathing, to imply that there was a same-sex relationship between the two. Both men denied the allegation of an affair.

Rustin became involved in the March on Washington in 1962 when he was recruited by A. Philip Randolph. The march was planned to be a commemoration of the Emancipation Proclamation one hundred years earlier. Rustin was instrumental in organizing the march. He drilled off-duty police officers as marshals, bus captains to direct traffic, and scheduled the podium speakers. Eleanor Holmes Norton and Rachelle Horowitz were aides. Despite King's support, NAACP chairman Roy Wilkins did not want Rustin to receive any public credit for his role in planning the march. Roy Wilkins said, "This march is of such importance that we must not put a person of his liabilities at the head." Because of this conflict, Randolph served as the director of the march and Rustin as his deputy. During the planning of the march, Rustin feared his previous legal issues would pose a threat to the march. Nevertheless, Rustin did become well known. On September 6, 1963, a photograph of Rustin and Randolph appeared on the cover of Life magazine, identifying them as "the leaders" of the March.

New York City school boycott

At the beginning of 1964, Reverend Milton Galamison and other Harlem community leaders invited Rustin to coordinate a citywide boycott of public schools to protest their de facto segregation. Prior to the boycott, the organizers asked the United Federation of Teachers Executive Board to join the boycott or ask teachers to join the picket lines. The union declined, promising only to protect from reprisals any teachers who participated. More than 400,000 New Yorkers participated in a one-day February 3, 1964 boycott. Historian Daniel Perlstein notes that "newspapers were astounded both by the numbers of black and Puerto Rican parents and children who boycotted and by the complete absence of violence or disorder from the protesters." It was, Rustin stated, and newspapers reported, "the largest civil rights demonstration" in American history. Rustin said that "the movement to integrate the schools will create far-reaching benefits" for teachers as well as students.

The protest demanded complete integration of the city's schools (which would require some whites to attend schools in black neighborhoods), and it challenged the coalition between African Americans and white liberals. An ensuing white backlash affected relations among the black leaders. Writing to black labor leaders, Rustin denounced Galamison for seeking to conduct another boycott in the spring and soon abandoned the coalition.

Rustin organized a May 18 March which called for "maximum possible" integration. Perlstein recounts. "This goal was to be achieved through such modest programs as the construction of larger schools and the replacement of junior high schools with middle schools. The UFT and other white moderates endorsed the May rally, yet only four thousand protesters showed up, and the Board of Education was no more responsive to the conciliatory May demonstration than to the earlier, more confrontational boycott."

When Rustin was invited to speak at the University of Virginia in 1964, school administrators tried to ban him, out of fear that he would organize a school boycott there.

From protest to politics

In the spring of 1964, Martin Luther King was considering hiring Rustin as executive director of SCLC but was advised against it by Stanley Levison, a longtime activist friend of Rustin's. He opposed the hire because of what he considered Rustin's growing devotion to the political theorist Max Shachtman. "Shachtmanites" have been described as an ideologically cultish group with ardently anti-communist positions, and attachments to the Democratic Party and the AFL–CIO.

At the 1964 Democratic National Convention, which followed Freedom Summer in Mississippi, Rustin became an adviser to the Mississippi Freedom Democratic Party (MFDP); they were trying to gain recognition as the legitimate, non-Jim Crow delegation from their state, where blacks had been officially disenfranchised since the turn of the century (as they were generally throughout the South) and excluded from the official political system. DNC leaders Lyndon Johnson and Hubert Humphrey offered only two non-voting seats to the MFDP, with the official seating going to the regular segregationist Mississippi delegation. Rustin, following a line set by Shachtman and AFL–CIO leaders, urged the MFDP to take the offer. MFDP leaders, including Fannie Lou Hamer and Bob Moses, angrily rejected the arrangement; many of their supporters became highly suspicious of Rustin. Rustin's attempt to compromise appealed to the Democratic Party leadership.

After the passage of the Civil Rights Act of 1964, Rustin advocated closer ties between the civil rights movement and the Democratic Party, specifically the party's base among the white working class, many of whom still had strong union affiliations. With Tom Kahn, Rustin wrote an influential article in 1964 called "From Protest to Politics", published in Commentary magazine; it analyzed the changing economy and its implications for African Americans. Rustin wrote presciently that the rise of automation would reduce the demand for low-skill high-paying jobs, which would jeopardize the position of the urban African American working class, particularly in northern states. He believed that the working class had to collaborate across racial lines for common economic goals. His prophecy has been proven right in the dislocation and loss of jobs for many urban African Americans due to the restructuring of industry in the coming decades.
Rustin believed that the African American community needed to change its political strategy, building and strengthening a political alliance with predominately white unions and other organizations (churches, synagogues, etc.) to pursue a common economic agenda. He wrote that it was time to move from protest to politics. Rustin's analysis of the economic problems of the Black community was widely influential.

Rustin argued that since black people could now legally sit in the restaurant after the passage of the Civil Rights Act of 1964, they needed to be able to afford service financially. He believed that a coalition of progressive forces to move the Democratic Party forward was needed to change the economic structure.

He also argued that the African American community was threatened by the appeal of identity politics, particularly the rise of "Black power". He thought this position was a fantasy of middle-class black people that repeated the political and moral errors of previous black nationalists, while alienating the white allies needed by the African American community. Nation editor and Harvard Law Professor Randall Kennedy noted later that, while Rustin had a general "disdain of nationalism", he had a "very different attitude toward Jewish nationalism" and was "unflaggingly supportive of Zionism".

Commentary editor-in-chief Norman Podhoretz had commissioned the article from Rustin, and the two men remained intellectually and personally aligned for the next 20 years. Podhoretz and the magazine promoted the neoconservative movement, which had implications for civil rights initiatives as well as other economic aspects of the society. In 1985, Rustin publicly praised Podhoretz for his refusal to "pander to minority groups" and for opposing affirmative action quotas in hiring as well as black studies programs in colleges.

Because of these positions, Rustin was criticized as a "sell-out" by many of his former colleagues in the civil rights movement, especially those connected to grassroots organizing. They charged that he was lured by the material comforts that came with a less radical and more professional type of activism. Biographer John D'Emilio rejects these characterizations, and "portrays the final third of Rustin's life as one in which his reputation among his former allies was routinely questioned. After decades of working outside the system, they simply could not accept working within the system." However, Randall Kennedy wrote in a 2003 article that descriptions of Rustin as "a bought man" are "at least partly true", noting that his sponsorship by the AFL–CIO brought him some financial stability but imposed boundaries on his politics.

Kennedy notes that despite Rustin's conservative turn in the mid-1960s, he remained a lifelong socialist, and D'Emilio argues that in the final phase of his life, Rustin remained on the left: "D'Emilio explains, even as Rustin was taking what appeared to be a more "conservative" turn, he remained committed to social justice. Rustin was making radical and ambitious demands for a basic redistribution of wealth in American society, including universal healthcare, the abolition of poverty, and full employment."

Labor movement: Unions and social democracy
Rustin increasingly worked to strengthen the labor movement, which he saw as the champion of empowerment for the African American community and for economic justice for all Americans. He contributed to the labor movement's two sides, economic and political, through the support of labor unions and social-democratic politics.
He was the founder and became the Director of the A. Philip Randolph Institute, which coordinated the AFL-CIO's work on civil rights and economic justice. He became a regular columnist for the AFL-CIO newspaper.

On the political side of the labor movement, Rustin increased his visibility as a leader of the American movement for social democracy. In early 1972, he became a national co-chairman of the Socialist Party of America. In December 1972, when the Socialist Party changed its name to Social Democrats, USA (SDUSA) by a vote of 73–34, Rustin continued to serve as national co-chairman, along with Charles S. Zimmerman of the International Ladies Garment Workers' Union (ILGWU). In his opening speech to the December 1972 Convention, Co-Chairman Rustin called for SDUSA to organize against the "reactionary policies of the Nixon Administration"; Rustin also criticized the "irresponsibility and élitism of the 'New Politics' liberals". In later years, Rustin served as the national chairman of SDUSA.

During the 1960s, Rustin was a member of the League for Industrial Democracy. He would remain a member for years, and became vice president during the 1980s.

Foreign policy
Like many liberals and some socialists, Rustin supported President Lyndon B. Johnson's containment policy against communism, while criticizing specific conduct of this policy. In particular, to maintain independent labor unions and political opposition in Vietnam, Rustin and others gave critical support to U.S. military intervention in the Vietnam War, while calling for a negotiated peace treaty and democratic elections. Rustin criticized the specific conduct of the war, though. For instance, in a fundraising letter sent to War Resisters League supporters in 1964, Rustin wrote of being "angered and humiliated by the kind of war being waged, a war of torture, a war in which civilians are being machine-gunned from the air, and in which American napalm bombs are being dropped on the villages."

Along with Allard Lowenstein and Norman Thomas, Rustin worked with the CIA-sponsored Committee on Free Elections in the Dominican Republic, which lent international credibility to a 1966 ballot effectively rigged against the socialist former president, Juan Bosch.

Throughout the 1970s and 1980s, Rustin worked as a human rights and election monitor for Freedom House.

In 1970, Rustin called for the U.S. to send military jets in the fight against Arab states by Israel; referring to a New York Times article he wrote, Rustin wrote to Prime Minister Golda Meir "...I hope that the ad will also have an effect on a serious domestic question: namely, the relations between the Jewish and the Negro communities in America." Rustin was concerned about unity between two groups that he argued faced discrimination in America and abroad, and also believed that Israel's democratic ideals were proof that justice and equality would prevail in the Arab territories despite the atrocities of war. His former colleagues in the peace movement considered it to be a profound betrayal of Rustin's nonviolent ideals.

Rustin maintained his strongly anti-Soviet and anti-communist views later in his life, especially with regard to Africa. Rustin co-wrote with Carl Gershman (a former director of Social Democrats, USA and future Ronald Reagan appointee) an essay entitled "Africa, Soviet Imperialism & the Retreat of American Power", in which he decried Russian and Cuban involvement in the Angolan Civil War and defended the military intervention by apartheid South Africa on behalf of the National Liberation Front of Angola (FNLA) and National Union for the Total Independence of Angola (UNITA). "And if a South African force did intervene at the urging of black leaders and on the side of the forces that clearly represent the black majority in Angola, to counter a non-African army of Cubans ten times its size, by what standard of political judgment is this immoral?" Rustin accused the Soviet Union of a classic imperialist agenda in Africa in pursuit of economic resources and vital sea lanes, and called the Carter Administration "hypocritical" for claiming to be committed to the welfare of blacks while doing too little to thwart Russian and Cuban expansion throughout Africa.

In 1976, Rustin was a member of the anti-communist Committee on the Present Danger (CPD), founded by politician Paul Nitze. Nitze was a member of Team B, the independent analysts commissioned by George Bush to scrutinize the CIA's assessments of the Soviet nuclear threat. CPD promoted Team B's controversial intelligence claims about Soviet foreign policy, using them as an argument against arms control agreements such as SALT II. This cemented Rustin's leading role in the neoconservative movement.

Soviet Jewry movement 

The plight of Jews in the Soviet Union reminded Rustin of the struggles that blacks faced in the United States. Soviet Jews faced many of the same forms of discrimination in employment, education, and housing, while also being prisoners within their own country by being denied the chance to emigrate by Soviet authorities. After seeing the injustice that Soviet Jews faced, Rustin became a leading voice in advocating for the movement of Jews from the Soviet Union to Israel. He worked closely with Senator Henry Jackson of Washington, who introduced legislation that tied trade relations with the Soviet Union to their treatment of Jews. In 1966 he chaired the historic Ad hoc Commission on Rights of Soviet Jews organized by the Conference on the Status of Soviet Jews, leading a panel of six jurors in the commission's public tribunal on Jewish life in the Soviet Union. Members of the panel included Telford Taylor, the Nuremberg war trial prosecutor and Columbia University professor of law, Dr. John C. Bennett, president of the Union Theological Seminary; Reverend George B. Ford, pastor emeritus of the Corpus Christi Church; Samuel Fishman representing United Automobile Workers; and Norman Thomas, veteran Socialist leader. The commission collected testimonies from Soviet Jews and compiled them into a report that was delivered to the secretary-general of the United Nations. The report urged the international community to demand that the Soviet authorities allow Jews to practice their religion, preserve their culture, and emigrate from the USSR at their will. The testimonies from Soviet Jews were published by Moshe Decter, the executive secretary of the Conference on the Status of Soviet Jews, in a book—Redemption! Jewish freedom letters from Russia, with a foreword by Rustin. Through the 1970s and 1980s Rustin wrote several articles on the subject of Soviet Jewry and appeared at Soviet Jewry movement rallies, demonstrations, vigils, and conferences, in the United States and abroad. He co-sponsored the National Interreligious Task Force on Soviet Jewry. Rustin allied with Senator Daniel Patrick Moynihan, an outspoken advocate for Soviet Jewry, and worked closely with Senator Henry Jackson, informing the Jackson–Vanik amendment, vital legislation that restricted United States trade with the Soviet Union in relation to its treatment of Jews.

Gay rights
Davis Platt, Bayard's partner from the 1940s, said "I never had any sense at all that Bayard felt any shame or guilt about his homosexuality. That was rare in those days. Rare."

Rustin did not engage in any gay rights activism until the 1980s. He was urged to do so by his partner Walter Naegle, who has said that "I think that if I hadn't been in the office at that time, when these invitations [from gay organizations] came in, he probably wouldn't have done them."

Due to the lack of marriage equality at the time, Rustin and Naegle took the then not unusual step to solidify their partnership and protect their union legally through adoption: in 1982 Rustin adopted Naegle, 30 years old at the time. Naegle explained that Bayard:

Rustin testified in favor of New York State's Gay Rights Bill. In 1986, he gave a speech "The New Niggers Are Gays" in which he asserted:

Also in 1986, Rustin was invited to contribute to the book In the Life: A Black Gay Anthology. He declined, explaining:

I was not involved in the struggle for gay rights as a youth... I did not "come out of the closet" voluntarily—circumstances forced me out. While I have no problem with being publicly identified as homosexual, it would be dishonest of me to present myself as one who was in the forefront of the struggle for gay rights... I fundamentally consider sexual orientation to be a private matter. As such, it has not been a factor which has greatly influenced my role as an activist.

Death and beliefs

Rustin died on August 24, 1987, of a perforated appendix. An obituary in The New York Times reported, "Looking back at his career, Mr. Rustin, a Quaker, once wrote: 'The principal factors which influenced my life are 1) nonviolent tactics; 2) constitutional means; 3) democratic procedures; 4) respect for human personality; 5) a belief that all people are one. Rustin was survived by Walter Naegle, his partner of ten years.

Rustin's personal philosophy is said to have been inspired by combining Quaker pacifism with socialism (as taught by A. Philip Randolph), and the theory of non-violent protest popularized by Mahatma Gandhi.

President Ronald Reagan issued a statement on Rustin's death, praising his work for civil rights and "for human rights throughout the world". He added that Rustin "was denounced by former friends, because he never gave up his conviction that minorities in America could and would succeed based on their individual merit".

Legacy

According to journalist Steve Hendrix, Rustin "faded from the shortlist of well-known civil rights lions", in part because he was active behind the scenes, and also because of public discomfort with his sexual orientation and former communist membership. In addition, Rustin's tilt toward neo-conservatism in the late 1960s led him into a disagreement with most civil rights leaders. But, the 2003 documentary film Brother Outsider: The Life of Bayard Rustin, a Sundance Festival Grand Jury Prize nominee, and the March 2012 centennial of Rustin's birth have contributed to renewed recognition of his extensive contributions.

Rustin served as chairman of Social Democrats, USA, which, The Washington Post wrote in 2013, "was a breeding ground for many neoconservatives". French historian Justin Vaïsse classifies him as a "right-wing socialist" and "second age neoconservative", citing his role as vice-chair of the Coalition for a Democratic Majority, which was involved in the second incarnation of the Committee on the Present Danger.

According to Daniel Richman, former clerk for United States Supreme Court justice Thurgood Marshall, Marshall's friendship with Rustin, who was open about his homosexuality, played a significant role in Marshall's dissent from the court's 5–4 decision upholding the constitutionality of state sodomy laws in the later overturned 1986 case Bowers v. Hardwick.

Several buildings have been named in honor of Rustin, including the Bayard Rustin Educational Complex located in Chelsea, Manhattan; Bayard Rustin High School in his hometown of West Chester, Pennsylvania; Bayard Rustin Library at the Affirmations Gay/Lesbian Community Center in Ferndale, Michigan; the Bayard Rustin Social Justice Center in Conway, Arkansas, and the Bayard Rustin Center for Social Justice in Princeton, New Jersey; the Bayard Rustin Room at Friends House, London, UK. 

Rustin is one of two men who have both participated in the Penn Relays and had a school, West Chester Rustin High School, named in his honor that participates in the relays. In 1985, Haverford College awarded Rustin an honorary doctorate in law.

1990s and 2000s
In 1995, a Pennsylvania State Historical Marker was placed at Lincoln and Montgomery Avenues, West Chester, Pennsylvania, on the grounds of Henderson High School, which he attended.

A 1998 anthology movie, Out of the Past, featured letters and archival footage of Rustin.

The West Chester Area School District voted in 2002 to approve the creation of Bayard Rustin High School in a 6–3 vote. Those in favor mentioned Rustin's involvement in the civil rights movement, and opposition was tied to Rustin's sexuality and political views. The school opened in 2006.

In July 2007 after a year's collaboration starting in June 2006, a group of San Francisco Bay Area Black LGBT community leaders officially formed the Bayard Rustin Coalition (BRC), with the permission of the Estate of Bayard Rustin. The BRC promotes greater Black participation in the electoral process, advances civil and human rights issues, and promotes the legacy of Rustin.

2010s and beyond

In 2011, the Bayard Rustin Center for LGBTQA Activism, Awareness, and Reconciliation was announced at Guilford College, a Quaker school. Formerly the Queer and Allied Resource Center, the center was rededicated in March 2011 with the permission of the Estate of Bayard Rustin and featured a keynote address by social justice activist Mandy Carter.

In 2012, Rustin was inducted into the Legacy Walk, an outdoor public display which celebrates LGBTQ history and people. In 2013, Rustin was selected as an honoree in the United States Department of Labor Hall of Honor.

On August 8, 2013, President Barack Obama posthumously awarded Rustin the Presidential Medal of Freedom, the highest civilian award in the United States. The citation in the press release stated:

Bayard Rustin was an unyielding activist for civil rights, dignity, and equality for all. An advisor to the Reverend Dr. Martin Luther King, Jr., he promoted nonviolent resistance, participated in one of the first Freedom Rides, organized the 1963 March on Washington for Jobs and Freedom, and fought tirelessly for marginalized communities at home and abroad. As an openly gay African American, Mr. Rustin stood at the intersection of several of the fights for equal rights.

At the White House ceremony on November 20, 2013, President Obama presented Rustin's award to Walter Naegle, his partner of ten years at the time of Rustin's death.

In 2014, Rustin was one of the inaugural honorees in the Rainbow Honor Walk, a walk of fame in San Francisco's Castro neighborhood noting LGBTQ people who have "made significant contributions in their fields". In April 2018, the Montgomery County Board of Education in Maryland voted to name the Bayard Rustin Elementary School after Rustin.

Canadian writer Steven Elliott Jackson wrote a play that stages an imaginary meeting and one-night-stand between Rustin and Walter Jenkins of the Johnson administration called The Seat Next to the King. The play won the award for Best Play at the 2017 Toronto Fringe Festival. A full-length play with music, written by Steve H. Broadnax III, Bayard Rustin Inside Ashland, dramatizing Rustin's World War II prison experience and its central role in his lifetime of activism, had its world premiere on May 22, 2022, at People's Light and Theatre Company in Malvern, Pennsylvania.

In June 2019, Rustin was one of the inaugural fifty American "pioneers, trailblazers, and heroes" inducted on the National LGBTQ Wall of Honor within the Stonewall National Monument (SNM) in New York City's Stonewall Inn. The SNM is the first U.S. national monument dedicated to LGBTQ rights and history, and the wall's unveiling was timed to take place during the 50th anniversary of the Stonewall riots.

In 2018, the Bayard Rustin Center for Social Justice was established in Princeton, New Jersey, with Naegle acting as Board Member Emeritus. It is a community activist center and safe space for LGBTQ kids, intersectional families, and marginalized people.

In January 2020, California State Senator Scott Wiener, chair of the California Legislative LGBT Caucus, and Assemblywoman Shirley Weber, chair of the California Legislative Black Caucus, called for Governor Gavin Newsom to issue a pardon for Rustin's 1953 arrest for having sex with a man in a car, citing Rustin's legacy as a civil rights icon. Newsom issued the pardon on February 5 while also announcing a new process for fast-tracking pardons for those convicted under historical laws making homosexuality illegal.

In 2021, Higher Ground Productions, founded by Michelle and Barack Obama, announced production of Rustin, a biopic about Rustin's life directed by George C. Wolfe and starring Colman Domingo in the titular role.

In 2022, a street in Nyack, New York was renamed "Bayard Rustin Way" to honor Rustin's memory.

Publications
 Interracial primer, New York: Fellowship of Reconciliation, 1943
 Interracial workshop: progress report, New York: Sponsored by Congress of Racial Equality and Fellowship of Reconciliation, 1947
 Journey of reconciliation: report, New York : Fellowship of Reconciliation, Congress of Racial Equality, 1947
 We challenged Jim Crow! a report on the journey of reconciliation, April 9–23, 1947, New York: Fellowship of Reconciliation, Congress of Racial Equality, 1947
 "In apprehension how like a god!", Philadelphia: Young Friends Movement 1948
 The revolution in the South", Cambridge, Massachusetts. : Peace Education Section, American Friends Service Committee, 1950s
 Report on Montgomery, Alabama New York: War Resisters League, 1956
 A report and action suggestions on non-violence in the South New York: War Resisters League, 1957
 Civil rights: the true frontier, New York: Donald Press, 1963
 From protest to politics: the future of the civil rights movement, New York: League for Industrial Democracy, 1965
 The city in crisis, (introduction) New York: A. Philip Randolph Educational Fund, 1965
 "Black power" and coalition politics, New York, American Jewish Committee 1966
 Which way? (with Daniel Patrick Moynihan), New York:  American Press, 1966
 The Watts "Manifesto" & the McCone report., New York, League for Industrial Democracy 1966
 Fear, frustration, backlash: the new crisis in civil rights, New York, Jewish Labor Committee 1966
 The lessons of the long hot summer, New York, American Jewish Committee 1967
 The Negro community: frustration politics, sociology and economics Detroit: UAW Citizenship-Legislative Department, 1967
 A way out of the exploding ghetto, New York: League for Industrial Democracy, 1967
 The alienated: the young rebels today and why they're different, Washington, D.C.: International Labor Press Association, 1967
 "Right to work" laws: a trap for America's minorities. New York: A. Philip Randolph Institute 1967
 Civil rights: the movement re-examined (contributor), New York: A. Philip Randolph Educational Fund, 1967
 Separatism or integration, which way for America?: a dialogue (with Robert Browne), New York, A. Philip Randolph Educational Fund, 1968
 The Report of the National Advisory Commission on Civil Disorders, an analysis, New York, American Jewish Committee 1968
 The labor-Negro coalition, a new beginning, Washington? D.C.: American Federationist?, 1968
 The anatomy of frustration, New York: Anti-Defamation League of B'nai B'rith, 1968
 Morals concerning minorities, mental health and identity, New York: A. Philip Randolph Institute, 1969
 Black studies: myths & realities, (contributor) New York: A. Philip Randolph Educational Fund, 1969
 Conflict or coalition?: the civil rights struggle and the trade union movement today, New York: A. Philip Randolph Institute, 1969
 Three essays, New York: A. Philip Randolph Institute, 1969
 Black rage, White fear: the full employment answer: an address, Washington, D.C.: Bricklayers, Masons & Plasterers International Union 1970
 A word to black students, New York: A. Philip Randolph Institute, 1970
 The failure of black separatism, New York: A. Philip Randolph Institute, 1970
 The blacks and the unions (contributor), New York: A. Philip Randolph Educational Fund, 1971
 Down the line; the collected writings of Bayard Rustin, Chicago: Quadrangle Books, 1971
 Affirmative action in an economy of scarcity (with Norman Hill), New York: A. Philip Randolph Institute, 1974
 Seniority and racial progress (with Norman Hill), New York: A. Philip Randolph Institute, 1975
 Have we reached the end of the second reconstruction?, Bloomington, Indiana: The Poynter Center, 1976
 Strategies for freedom: the changing patterns of Black protest, New York: Columbia University Press 1976
 Africa, Soviet imperialism and the retreat of American power, New York: Social Democrats, USA (reprint), 1978 
 South Africa: is peaceful change possible? a report  (contributor), New York: New York Friends Group, 1984
 Time on two crosses: the collected writings of Bayard Rustin, San Francisco: Cleis Press, 2003
 I Must Resist: Bayard Rustin's Life in Letters: City Lights, 2012

See also
 List of civil rights leaders
 Timeline of the civil rights movement

References

Bibliography
 Anderson, Jervis. Bayard Rustin: Troubles I've Seen (New York: HarperCollins Publishers, 1997).
 Bennett, Scott H. Radical Pacifism: The War Resisters League and Gandhian Nonviolence in America, 1915–1963 (Syracuse Univ. Press, 2003). .
 Branch, Taylor. Parting the Waters: America in the King Years, 1954–63 (New York: Touchstone, 1989).
 Carbado, Devon W. and Donald Weise, editors. Time on Two Crosses: The Collected Writings of Bayard Rustin (San Francisco: Cleis Press, 2003). 
 D'Emilio, John. Lost Prophet: Bayard Rustin and the Quest for Peace and Justice in America (New York: The Free Press, 2003).
 D'Emilio, John. Lost Prophet: The Life and Times of Bayard Rustin (Chicago: The University of Chicago Press, 2004). 
Frazier, Nishani (2017). Harambee City: Congress of Racial Equality in Cleveland and the Rise of Black Power Populism. University of Arkansas Press. .
 Haskins, James. Bayard Rustin: Behind the Scenes of the Civil Rights Movement (New York: Hyperion, 1997).
 Hirschfelder, Nicole. Oppression as Process: The Case of Bayard Rustin (Heidelberg: Universitätsverlag Winter, 2014). 
 Kates, Nancy and Bennett Singer (dirs.) Brother Outsider: The Life of Bayard Rustin (2003)
 King, Martin Luther Jr.; Carson, Clayborne; Luker, Ralph & Penny A. Russell The Papers of Martin Luther King, Jr.: Volume IV: Symbol of the Movement, January 1957 – December 1958. University of California Press, 2000. 
 Le Blanc, Paul and Michael Yates, A Freedom Budget for All Americans: Recapturing the Promise of the Civil Rights Movement in the Struggle for Economic Justice Today (New York: Monthly Review Press, 2013).
Podair, Jerald E. "Bayard Rustin: American Dreamer" (Lanham, MD: Rowman & Littlefield Pub., 2009). 
 
 Lewis, David L. King: A Biography. (University of Illinois Press, 1978). .
 Rustin, Bayard. Down the Line: The Collected Writings of Bayard Rustin (Chicago: Quadrangle Books, 1971).

External links

 SNCC Digital Gateway: Bayard Rustin, Documentary website created by the SNCC Legacy Project and Duke University, telling the story of the Student Nonviolent Coordinating Committee & grassroots organizing from the inside-out
 Bayard Rustin – Who Is This Man?
 
 FBI file on Bayard Rustin 
 Bayard Rustin, Civil Rights Leader, from Quakerinfo.org
 Brother Outsider, a documentary on Rustin
 Randall Kennedy, "From Protest to Patronage." The Nation
 Guide to the Papers of Bayard Rustin at the American Jewish Historical Society.
 
 Bayard Rustin Collected Papers finding aid at the Swarthmore College Peace Collection

1912 births
1987 deaths
African-American activists
20th-century American LGBT people
20th-century Quakers
Activists from Pennsylvania
African-American Christians
Activists for African-American civil rights
American anti–Vietnam War activists
American Christian pacifists
American Christian socialists
American Christian Zionists
American democratic socialists
African-American Quakers
American social democrats
Cheyney University of Pennsylvania alumni
Community organizing
Converts to Quakerism
Freedom Riders
LGBT African Americans
LGBT conservatism in the United States
LGBT people from Pennsylvania
LGBT Protestants
American LGBT rights activists
Members of Social Democrats USA
Members of the Socialist Party of America
Nonviolence advocates
People from West Chester, Pennsylvania
People who have received posthumous pardons
Presidential Medal of Freedom recipients
Quaker socialists
War Resisters League activists
Soviet Jewry movement activists
American Quakers